Kujan (also Romanized as Kūjān; also known as Kūhjān) is a village in Dodangeh Rural District, Hurand District, Ahar County, East Azerbaijan Province, Iran. At the 2006 census, its population was 23, in 4 families.

References 

Populated places in Ahar County